Misheel Jargalsaikhan (born 9 November 1988 in Ulaanbaatar, Mongolia) is a Polish child actress who moved with her family to Chojnice in Poland at the age of three. Since 1999 she has been acting in Rodzina zastępcza TV series.

Filmography
2007 --- Pogoda na piątek (TV series)
2002 --- Bardzo dużo Sylwestrów (TV)
2001 --- Kolęda z komórki (TV)
2000 --- Uwolnić Mikołaja (TV)
1999 --- Świąteczna awaria (TV)
1999-2007 --- Rodzina zastępcza (TV series)

External links
 
 Misheel Jargalsikhan at filmweb.pl

1988 births
Living people
People from Ulaanbaatar
Polish child actresses
Mongolian emigrants to Poland
Naturalized citizens of Poland